Dan Stains (born 28 June 1964) is an Australian former rugby league footballer and coach.

Background
Stains was born in Toowoomba, Queensland, Australia. He attended Centenary Heights State High School in Toowoomba.

Playing career
Stains played for Halifax and captained Cronulla-Sutherland Sharks where he won the 1988 minor premiership with them. Stains had also represented Australia and Queensland State of Origin.

Coaching career
Stains had previously been coach at Super League clubs Bradford Bulls and London Broncos, and is currently coaching the U14 Nambour Crushers.

References

External links
Dan Stains at stateoforigin.com.au
Australian Rugby League stats
Challenge Cup profile
Broncos install Stains as coach
Queensland representatives at qrl.com.au

1964 births
Living people
Australia national rugby league team players
Australian rugby league coaches
Balmain Tigers players
Cronulla-Sutherland Sharks players
Halifax R.L.F.C. players
London Broncos coaches
London Broncos players
Queensland Rugby League State of Origin players
Rugby league hookers
Rugby league players from Toowoomba
Rugby league props
Rugby league second-rows